Shimazuella kribbensis  is a mesophilic bacterium from the genus of Shimazuella which has been isolated from forest soil from the Sobaek Mountains in Korea.

References

Further reading

External links
Type strain of Shimazuella kribbensis at BacDive -  the Bacterial Diversity Metadatabase	

Bacillales
Bacteria described in 2007